Max Mirnyi and Jamie Murray were the defending champions, but did not compete together that year.
Mirnyi partnered with Ashley Fisher, but lost in the first round to Bob Bryan and Mike Bryan.
Murray partnered with Dušan Vemić, but lost in the quarterfinals to Rajeev Ram and Bobby Reynolds.
Bob Bryan and Mike Bryan won in the final, 6–4, 6–4, over Marcelo Melo and André Sá.

Seeds

Draw

Draw

External links
Draw

Doubles